Davenport-Bradfield House, also known as the Bradfield House, is a historic home located at Sheridan, Hamilton County, Indiana.  It was built in 1875, and is a two-story, Italianate style brick dwelling.  It has a hipped roof and features a full-width, one-story front porch with turned posts, sawn brackets and trim, and paneled frieze.

It was listed on the National Register of Historic Places in 1985.

References

Houses on the National Register of Historic Places in Indiana
Italianate architecture in Indiana
Houses completed in 1875
Buildings and structures in Hamilton County, Indiana
National Register of Historic Places in Hamilton County, Indiana